Tiracola aureata is a moth of the family Noctuidae first described by Jeremy Daniel Holloway in 1989. It is found from India and from China to Sundaland.

References 

Hadeninae